Oddments is the fourth studio album by Australian psychedelic rock band King Gizzard & the Lizard Wizard. It was released on 7 March 2014 on Flightless. It peaked at No. 13 on the ARIA Albums Chart after being re-released on vinyl in November 2018. "Work This Time" remains the band's most listened-to track on Spotify, with over 37.9 million plays to date.

Background and recording 
Oddments was announced on 14 January 2014, with "Vegemite" serving as the album's lead single. Lead vocalist Stu Mackenzie said that the song was "probably the most literal song [he's] ever written". Oddments consists of outtakes from the band's prior releases, with the album serving as a way to compile the songs without necessarily adhering to a sound or theme as the band had done up until that point; the oddment nature of the songs (being leftovers from previous albums) gave the album its name. The album opener "Alluda Majaka" refers to and features an audio sample of the Tollywood 1995 film of the same name. During production of the album, Mackenzie's laptop was stolen with the masters for several tracks on the album alongside a majority of the tracks from The Murlocs' debut album Loopholes, forcing both bands to rerecord the lost material.

Reception 

Oddments was King Gizzard's fourth album in 18 months, with some reviewers noting that the album's quality seemingly suffered from the rush to quickly turnaround new material. Reviewers and retrospectives on the band's discography also noted that the album was overall stylistically fractured and incohesive, something other releases of theirs had not been prior nor since, although some reviewers and retrospectives also pointed out that songs had a pop lean to them.

Track listing 
All tracks written and produced by Stu Mackenzie, except where noted.

Vinyl releases have tracks 1–6 on Side A, and tracks 7–12 on Side B.

Personnel 
Credits for Oddments adapted from liner notes.

King Gizzard & the Lizard Wizard
 Michael Cavanagh
 Cook Craig
 Ambrose Kenny-Smith
 Stu Mackenzie
 Eric Moore
 Lucas Skinner
 Joe Walker

Additional musicians
 Monty Hartnett – drums (tracks 9 and 10)

Production
 Stu Mackenzie – production (tracks 1–5 and 7–12)
 Joe Walker – production (tracks 2, 5 and 6)
 Joe Carra – mastering
 Jason Galea – cover art and layout
 Jarrad Brown – recording assistance (track 7)

Charts

References

2014 albums
King Gizzard & the Lizard Wizard albums
Flightless (record label) albums
Psychedelic pop albums
Folk rock albums by Australian artists